English Village is a historic cooperative apartment complex in Richmond, Virginia. The planned community was designed by Richmond architect Bascom Joseph Rowlett and built in 1927. It consists of Tudor Revival style brick and half-timber buildings. The building complex was listed on the National Register of Historic Places in 1983.

The development includes 17 attached 2 1/2-story units organized in a U-shape around a central courtyard set back from the street.

English Village is one of the first cooperatives in the city of Richmond, an early example of a 1920s planned community. The infrastructure is largely shared amongst the units, with radiant heating utilizing water delivered from a central boiler system.

References

Residential buildings on the National Register of Historic Places in Virginia
Tudor Revival architecture in Virginia
Residential buildings completed in 1927
Buildings and structures in Richmond, Virginia
National Register of Historic Places in Richmond, Virginia